Yerson Mosquera Valdelamar (born 2 May 2001) is a Colombian professional footballer who plays as a centre-back for Major League Soccer club FC Cincinnati, on loan from Wolverhampton Wanderers.

Mosquera made his breakthrough at Atlético Nacional, where he marked his professional debut against River Plate in the Copa Sudamericana in October 2020.

Club career
Raised in Nueva Colonia within the municipality of Turbo in Colombia's Antioquia Department, Mosquera began his journey in football at the Fundación Elkin Murillo Amor (later renamed for Nayo Murillo after being taken over by Jhon Jairo Murillo) founded by his uncle Elkin Murillo, before joining Urabá Junior and later returning to his uncle's amateur club, Filandia Fútbol Club. Although now a defender, he was deployed as both a forward and winger as a young child, playing as a defensive midfielder at the age of 11 before moving to centre-back.

He joined the youth setup of Atlético Nacional in 2018, having been identified by a club scout during the 2018 Torneo de las Américas in Cali while playing for Filandia, and after successes with youth teams in 2018 and 2019, made his debut for the first team in the January 2020 edition of the Florida Cup. Mosquera made his professional debut for the club in October, where despite being sent off in a Copa Sudamericana game against River Plate, his impressive performance was rewarded with his continued integration in Nacional's first-team squad in the following months, and he scored his first professional goal in a 3–2 away win against Alianza Petrolera on 11 November.

On 17 June 2021, Mosquera joined Premier League side Wolverhampton Wanderers on a five-year deal, having been on the verge of signing for Club Brugge. After sustaining an injury in pre season, Mosquera would make his debut and start for Wolves in third round EFL Cup against Tottenham Hotspur. However, only nine minutes into that game, Mosquera picked up a hamstring injury and was subbed off. He underwent sugery, being sidelined until January 2022.

On 2 February 2023, Mosquera joined Major League Soccer side FC Cincinnati on loan until 30 June with an option to extend until the end of the year.

International career
Mosquera is a Colombian youth international was called up to train with the senior squad in February 2021. He was called up to play with the Colombian under-18 team in the 2019 SBS Cup, and was a starter in two of three matches during a championship-winning run. He earned his first call-up to the under-20s in October 2019, and having scored one goal in two appearances with the under-20s in December 2020, is also expected to be called up for the 2021 South American U-20 Championship.

Style of play
Mosquera is considered a strong, quick defender, as well as a "complete" centre-back endowed with great aerial ability, which allows him to win the vast majority of his defensive duels. He is highly involved in most of his team's defensive actions, and is comparable to Rúben Dias on the ball and Wesley Fofana out of possession, with long passing ability and physical attributes similar to fellow Colombian centre-back Yerry Mina and pace and acceleration akin to that of Davinson Sánchez.

Personal life
Mosquera is the nephew of former Colombia national team striker Elkin Murillo, whose club he played for as a child. Nicknamed "Ye" as a child and at Urabá, and "Yerri" at Atlético Nacional, Mosquera is one of ten siblings in his family (including a foster brother). His father, Jesús Adán Mosquera, is a banana plantation worker, while his maternal great uncle Agustín Julio was a Colombia national team goalkeeper. Two of his cousins, Daniel Valdelamar and Gustavo Cañizalez, also had short-lived careers within the Colombian top-flight.

Career statistics

References

External links

Living people
2001 births
Colombian footballers
Association football defenders
Colombia youth international footballers
Categoría Primera A players
Atlético Nacional footballers
Wolverhampton Wanderers F.C. players
FC Cincinnati players
Colombian expatriate footballers
Colombian expatriate sportspeople in England
Expatriate footballers in England
People from Apartadó
Sportspeople from Antioquia Department
21st-century Colombian people